The fat content of milk is the proportion of milk, by weight,
made up by butterfat. The fat content, particularly of cow's milk, is modified to make a variety of products. The fat content of milk is usually stated on the container, and the color of the label or milk bottle top varied to enable quick recognition.

Health and nutrition
Fat has more nutritional energy per cup, but researchers found that in general low fat milk drinkers do absorb less fat, and will compensate for the energy deficit by eating more carbohydrates. They also found that the lower milk fat drinkers also ate more fruits and vegetables, while the higher milk fat drinkers also ate more meat and sweets.

Nutrition intake between whole milk drinkers and skimmed or low fat drinkers is different. An analysis of a survey done by the  Department of Agriculture showed that consumers of reduced or low fat milk had greater intake of vitamins, minerals, and dietary fiber compared to the group of whole milk drinkers, yet zinc, vitamin E, and calcium were all under consumed in each group. The conclusion was that the whole milk drinkers were more likely to choose foods that were less micronutrient-dense, which resulted in their less healthful diets.

Researchers at the University of Copenhagen, in Denmark, found that drinking full-fat milk may actually be better for your heart than drinking skimmed milk. This is because it boosted levels of HDL cholesterol in the bloodstream.

Methods for reducing fat content 
Today, most skim milk is created by spinning whole milk in a centrifuge so that the fat droplets separate out. To make lowfat milk, one can simply mix skim and whole milk in a fixed ratio.

The fat content of the raw milk produced by cows ranges from about 3.3% up to 5%.  It varies by breed, and by diet, and can also be altered by selective breeding and genetic modification. For example, scientists in New Zealand have bred cows that produce milk with less than 1% fat content.

Methods of detecting fat content 
Milk's fat content can be determined by experimental means, such as the Babcock test or Gerber method.  Before the Babcock test was created, dishonest milk dealers could adulterate milk to falsely indicate a higher fat content.  In 1911, the American Dairy Science Association's Committee on Official Methods of Testing Milk and Cream for Butterfat met in Washington DC with the U.S. Bureau of Dairying, the U.S. Bureau of Standards and manufacturers of glassware.  Standard specifications for the Babcock methodology and equipment were published as a result of this meeting.  Improvements to the Babcock test have continued.

Terms for fat content by country 
The terminology for different types of milk, and the regulations regarding labelling, varies by country and region.

Australia 
While regular or whole milk has an average of 3.5% fat, reduced-fat milks have at least 25% less fat than regular milk. Low-fat milk must contain less than 1.5% fat and skim or ‘fat-free’ milk has no more than 0.15% fat.

Canada 

In Canada "whole" milk refers to creamline (unhomogenized) milk.  "Homogenized" milk (abbreviated to "homo" on labels and in speech) refers to milk which is 3.25% butterfat (or milk fat). There are also skim, 1%, and 2% milk fat milks. Modern commercial dairy processing techniques involve first removing all of the butterfat, and then adding back the appropriate amount depending on which product is being produced on that particular line.

United States 

In the USA, skim milk is also known as nonfat milk, due to USDA regulations stating that any food with less than ½ gram of fat per serving can be labelled "fat free".

In the U.S. and Canada, a blended mixture of milk and cream is called half and half. Half and half is usually sold in smaller packages and used for creaming coffee and similar uses.

United Kingdom 
Three main varieties of milk by fat content are sold in the UK, skimmed, semi-skimmed and whole milk. Semi-skimmed is by far the most popular variety, accounting for 63% of all milk sales. Whole milk follows with 27% and then skimmed with 6%. Until 1 January 2008, milk with butterfat content outside the ranges defined by the European Commission could not legally be sold as milk. This included 1% milk, meaning varieties with 1% butterfat content could not be labelled as milk. Lobbying by Britain has allowed these other percentages to be sold as milk. Since the change in regulation, all major supermarkets have launched a 1% variety.

See also 

 Milk
 Milk powder
 Butterfat
 Cream

References 

Milk